Fagotia is a genus of freshwater snails with an operculum, aquatic gastropod mollusks in the family Melanopsidae.

Species
Species within the genus Fagotia include:
 Fagotia daudebartii (Prevost 1821)
 Fagotia esperi (A. Ferussac 1823)
 † Fagotia wuesti Meijer, 1990

References

 Fauna Europaea info

Melanopsidae
Taxonomy articles created by Polbot